Nooksack is a city in Whatcom County, Washington,  south of the border with Canada. The population was 1,338 at the 2010 census.

Nooksack shares Nooksack Valley School District with the nearby Sumas and Everson.  The town is just a handful of buildings built around the State Route 9 highway that runs through it, and contracts the police and sewer services through the adjacent City of Everson. The post office lost its official status in 1992 (now a department of neighboring Everson) and the USPS has since closed the remote office, but the building still exists across from a small city park. Other noticeable remains are the two gas stations and several churches. It has no major geographic features except two small creeks that drains into the Sumas River on the edge of town, near a cemetery containing many old graves.

History

Nooksack was officially incorporated on December 6, 1912, and experienced much growth in its early years. It had a rail station, connecting it to the national train network. However, serious fires in the town in the early 20th century caused most of the growth to halt.

A merger between Nooksack and neighboring Everson into a single city was proposed by a citizens group in February 2009 with support from local officials.  Names for the proposed new city included "Nooksack Valley". The proposal was dropped in May following a unanimous vote by the Nooksack City Council to not move forward based on public feedback.

Noosack lacks its own ZIP code due to a decision by the U.S. Postal Service in 1992 to station the postmaster in Everson, forcing the two cities to share ZIP code 98247. As a result, the city was found to have lost sales tax revenue that was instead distributed to Everson based on the ZIP code.

Notable people
Darius and Tabitha Kinsey, notable early twentieth century photographers, are buried in Nooksack. They specialised in documentary photographs as social commentaries and also images of early logging, fishing and railroad operations.
Jim Sterk, former college athletic director
Louie Gong, Native American artist and activist

Geography
Nooksack is located at  (48.928240, -122.319544).

Climate
The climate in this area has mild differences between highs and lows, and there is adequate rainfall year-round.  According to the Köppen Climate Classification system, Nooksack has a marine west coast climate, abbreviated "Cfb" on climate maps.

Demographics

2010 census
As of the census of 2010, there were 1,338 people, 434 households, and 357 families residing in the city. The racial makeup of the city was 81.4% White, 0.1% African American, 2.3% Native American, 1.6% Asian, 0.1% Pacific Islander, 9.4% from other races, and 4.9% from two or more races. Hispanic or Latino of any race were 17.9% of the population.

There were 434 households, of which 49.5% had children under the age of 18 living with them, 66.4% were married couples living together, 11.3% had a female householder with no husband present, 4.6% had a male householder with no wife present, and 17.7% were non-families. 15.2% of all households were made up of individuals, and 5.5% had someone living alone who was 65 years of age or older. The average household size was 3.08 and the average family size was 3.37.

The median age in the city was 29.6 years. 31.8% of residents were under the age of 18; 9.2% were between the ages of 18 and 24; 30.8% were from 25 to 44; 20.7% were from 45 to 64; and 7.6% were 65 years of age or older. The gender makeup of the city was 49.4% male and 50.6% female.

2000 census
At the 2000 census, there were 851 people, 276 households and 218 families residing in the city. The population density was 1,207.9 per square mile (469.4/km2). There were 296 housing units at an average density of 420.2 per square mile (163.3/km2). The racial makeup of the city was 91.54% White, 0.47% African American, 1.29% Native American, 1.65% Asian, 3.29% from other races, and 1.76% from two or more races. Hispanic or Latino of any race were 6.58% of the population.

There were 276 households, of which 46.7% had children under the age of 18 living with them, 65.2% were married couples living together, 8.0% had a female householder with no husband present, and 21.0% were non-families. 16.7% of all households were made up of individuals, and 3.6% had someone living alone who was 65 years of age or older. The average household size was 3.08 and the average family size was 3.54.

36.8% of the population were under the age of 18, 8.2% from 18 to 24, 29.4% from 25 to 44, 18.4% from 45 to 64, and 7.2% who were 65 years of age or older. The median age was 29 years. For every 100 females, there were 96.1 males. For every 100 females age 18 and over, there were 100.0 males.

The median household income was $44,000 and the median family income was $49,000. Males had a median income of $36,429 compared with $21,750 for females. The per capita income for the city was $16,019. About 2.3% of families and 3.2% of the population were below the poverty line, including 3.3% of those under age 18 and 9.4% of those age 65 or over.

Education
Public education is provided by the Nooksack Valley School District.  It operates one high school, one middle school, and three elementary schools that serve Nooksack, Everson, and surrounding areas.

References

External links
 Official website

 
Cities in Washington (state)
Cities in Whatcom County, Washington
Populated places established in 1912
1912 establishments in Washington (state)
Washington placenames of Native American origin